United Nations Security Council Resolution 11, adopted on November 15, 1946, set the conditions under Article 93, paragraph 2 of the United Nations Charter upon which Switzerland would be admitted to the International Court of Justice.

See also
List of United Nations Security Council Resolutions 1 to 100 (1946–1953)

References

External links
 
Text of the Resolution at undocs.org

 0011
 0011
 0011
1946 in Switzerland
November 1946 events